Keyi (pronounced  meaning "Ship Owner" in Persian language), (Keyi Muslims) are one of the several denominations among Muslims of Kerala, India. The Keyis are known for their immense wealth and land properties acquired through trade with the English East India Company. The Keyi family has its roots in Thalassery, Kannur district. Keyis only marry from another Keyi family and are noted for their matrilinear system of inheritance.

History
Kunhipacki Keyi – the fourth lineal descendant who became the head of this affluent family in 1809 was the first to be addressed with this honorific title.

His predecessors Aluppy and Moosa started trading with Gujaratis They were addressed by Gujaratis who had trade relations with Thalassery as Kakka which is also Gujarati word meaning Karanavar, applied to both among elderly or respected person among both Hindus and Muslims. The title Kakka became associated with their successors up to Kunhipacki and from Kunhipacki onwards they were known by the appellation, Keyi.

The term Keyi is of Urdu origin meaning owner. In those days crew of the ships called their masters as Keyis. Since the Keyis were also owning ships they also came to be adored with this title. The Keyis were very generous, honest and truthful. Owing to the immense wealth of the family a kind of aristocracy is attached to them. Even today, the Keyis enjoy a high and elevated position in the community.

Aluppikakka
The history of Keyis can be traced back to 17th century - about 1671 AD when English East India Company established their factory at Tellicherry, it resulted to the large scale migration of merchants from other trade centers of North Malabar. Aluppikakka who is regarded as the founder of the family, the first among the Keralites who found a prominent place in foreign trade, a dealer in copra and spices in Chovva, which was then a rural village about 4 km south east of Kannur. Aluppikakka was so shrewd a businessman that the merchants whom he had sold the spices to were exporting them to foreign countries from Thalassery and earning huge profits decided to migrate to Thalassery with a view to have commerce with distant places.

Aluppikakka purchased a small strip of land in Thalassery from the Kottayam Raja near the foreshore, built a thatched warehouse and started the business. Within a short time his business developed and he brought his two sisters and children. This group form the basis of Keyi family – a family to be remembered, hereafter a name to figure brilliantly in the history of Malabar. Since the family come from Chovva they were called 'Chovvakkaran' and their name begins with the initial 'C'. The small warehouse was replaced with a big one, which came to be called Kakka's Pandikasala, and he began exporting spices to foreign countries.

Thalassery was ruled by English East India Company and Aluppikaka got extensive help from them in his business but the worst he had to face was from the Vaniambalath, a powerful Muslim family. They were jealously watching the growing wealth of Aluppikaka. Aluppi was very diplomatic and he tried to win over their favor through a marital alliance –- but his decision to marry a lady of their family was disapproved by their Karanavar. So he took a bride from Achorath family. The refusal to grant consent for Aluppikakka's marriage with a lady of their house was taken as an insult by Aluppikaka and he gave an injunction to his family members not to have marital relation with them in future.

All the Keyi's family branches except one particular family honored their Karanavar's decision. The hatred went to such an extent that they prevented Aluppikakka from going for prayer in the mosque under their jurisdiction and also forbade the Kazi from doing any religious services to him. Aluppikakka never yielded before them. He built a separate mosque known as Thazhathupalli, and arranged a separate Kazi for his family. Thereafter Keyis were having separate Kadhis to perform religious functions. When Aluppikakka's family expanded he built a beautiful house, known as Orkatteri, known for its exquisite splendor and architectural beauty.

When he died he was buried in his own mosque.

Moosakakka
Although Aluppikakka laid the foundation of Keyi family, it was his nephew Moosakakka, who was responsible for strengthening the family's position to the extent that it came to dominate the Malabar economy. He was also known as Chovvakkaran Moosa.

When the Mysorian interlude began Moosakakka proved to be a friend of British and came to the rescue of the Rajas. Chirakkal Raja and family, who took refuge in Thalassery's Sri Ramaswamy temple, were taken along with all their wealth in pathemars and small ships to Travancore. The Travancore Maharaja gave them asylum (The Travancore Dynasty was the mother family (or lineage) of the Kolathiri (Chirakkal) Royal Family who ruled over the Kannur-Wayanad-Kasaragod regions which included Thalassery)

During the Mysorean raids in the late 1700s, trade decreased and the business which Moosakakka started with the help of his uncle, struggled greatly. He left Thalassery to Venad to seek the help of the Maharaja of Travancore. The king gave him financial help to start a new business. His business flourished and he returned with gifts and asked the Maharaja to take back the money he had given him. The king declined and gave him all facilities to trade in his kingdom. He guaranteed a supply of teakwood, which he used for the construction of a mosque in Thalassery and other projects. In Alappuzha, for the smooth transporting of his merchandise Moosakakka constructed a canal, which is known as "Moosakakka canal". The places where he lived came to be known as "Moosakakka Valap".

With immense wealth he returned to Thalassery and constructed a warehouse designed along the lines of the warehouses in Bombay. The front portion of this warehouse was ornamented with glass. It eventually came to be called Kannadi Pandikasala, and has survived today.

Finally Kerala came under the suzerainty of the British. The Keyi dominance in trade increased considerably. With British help, Moosakakka established trade relationswith the British East India Company and deployed a network of family agents throughout India and in Europe, specifically, in London, Paris and Amsterdam. He was also a contractor to the company for supplying essential commodities.

Like his uncle, he also constructed a beautiful mosque in Thalassery in the 'Karimbin-odam' (Sugarcane plantation), which formerly belonged to the Dutch, but was occupied
by the British and later purchased by Moosakakka. Odam means 'garden' in the Dutch language. Since it was constructed in Odam the mosque came to be called Odathil Palli, meaning 'mosque in Odam'. The mosque had copper plate roofing and a golden dome in the minor and scenic features such as the ones noted in the Brahmonical tradition. There was opposition in laying the dome - a privilege enjoyed by the temples so Zamorin gave timely permission to lay the domes and the minaret. It highlights the communal harmony that prevailed in those days and the policy of enlightened toleration followed by the Kerala rulers. All the Muslims can offer prayers but in the Kabaristan (graveyard adjacent to the mosque) only the dead bodies of the Keyis, their wives and children are buried.

Moosakakka became a mediator in the war between British and the Arakkal family, the only Muslim ruling dynasty in Kerala. The Raja accepted the rule of British and the Company asked the Raja to pay 1,000,000 rupees as war indemnity. The Raja failed to pay the money and Moosakakka paid the money for the Raja and later recovered from the revenues which were hypothecated to him. In appreciation the Raja gave consent for marriage of a beebi (lady) of his family with Ussenkutty, a nephew of Moosakaka.

The title Elaya was conferred on the consort as per custom guest like the Elaya Koyil Thampuran confers on the consort in Travancore. This nobleman died in 1806 and was buried in his own mosque, the Odathilpalli, and a mausoleum is erected on his grave.

Kunhahmed Keyi
Moosakaka did not live to see the domes of the Odathil Palli erected so the ceremony was done in 1861 by Kunhamed Keyi of Keloth branch of Keyis. A strange practice of mass entertainment was done by emptying sugar bags in a well to give sweetened water to the large number of coreligionists assembled to witness the function.

Keyi descendants
Moosakakka was followed by Valia Makki Kakka and then by Kunjipakki. Keyi has already been referred to Aluppy Kakka and Moosakakka lived in pomp and splendour but none of the descendants had the grandeur of their predecessors. Cheriya Makki was the last of the Keyis to head the whole family. After his period Keyi family was divided subdivided and now altogether there
are ten branches of Keyis. Cheriya Makki Keyi was least interested in his forefathers' business so it began to decline.

Contributions to society
Even from the beginning of 19th century Keyi began to play a dominant role in all fields and produced leading figures  in every walk of life. The justice party and the Kerala Muslim Majlis had its origin in Thalassery. The founder president of Majlis the predecessor of Muslim League C.P. Mamookeyi hails from Puthiyapura branch of Keyis. The first among them to receive the title Khan Bahadur from the British was C.K. Mohammad (Mammad) Keyi of Keloth Branch. C.O.T Kunhipackey Keyi was the first Director of Public Instruction (DPI) of Kerala state. C.P. Mamookeyi of Pawkath branch was the first Muslim to head the Thalassery Municipality as chairman. Mayankutty Elayavu of Valiapura branch was a great philosopher and poet and well versed in philosophy. Tafsir, the first Malayalam translation of the Quran was done by him. He constructed a 'Keyi Rubat' at holy Mecca for the welfare of Hajjis from Kerala. It served as a shelter for pilgrims for a very long time until its demolition by the Saudi Government. A.P. M Umerkutty wrote a book on Keyis in Malayalam titled Malayalathile Keyimar which throws a flood of light on the historical background of Keyis. The Arabian dish Alsa and the Mughal dish Biriyani was popularised by Keyis in Kerala. The ritual arts like Arabanamuttu and Daffmuttu was also patronized by them.

Modern-day Keyis
C.K.P. Cheriya Mammoo Keyi whose name is memorable as a kingmaker in Kerala politics. C.P. Pocker Sahib and Kunhipackey Keyi were famous cricket players during British period. C.V. Mayankutty Keyi of Valiapurayil was a famous wrestler. P.V. Kunhi Moosa of Puthiya Valap was a famous horticulturist and tennis player.
When India attained independence, road transport increased and with the emergence of Cochin and Mangalore ports, minor ports were abandoned. This led to the closure of Tellicherry port an ancient seaport on the Malabar coast. consequently native and foreign trading companies who were concentrating on spices exports began to depend upon modern seaports. The Keyis as a trading house also disappeared from the area. Though they have no glory as in the past, the majority of buildings in Thalassery belong to the Keyis. Some of the buildings and houses they erected in the past are in good preservation as venerable landmarks of a glorious past.

See also
 Arakkal Raja
 Odathil Palli
 East India Company
 Mappila
 Thalassery

References

 , The Hindu online edition
 Keyi family patriarch's legacy of harmony hailed  News item in The Hindu newspaper
 Keyis of North Malabar Article from Kerala government website
 The Keyi Mappila Muslim Merchants of Tellicherry
 Keyis of Malabar
  Odathil Mosque

Mappilas
People from Thalassery
Kerala families